Pays de Montbéliard Agglomération is the communauté d'agglomération, an intercommunal structure, centred on the city of Montbéliard. It is located in the Doubs department, in the Bourgogne-Franche-Comté region, eastern France. It was established in January 2017 by the merger of the former communauté d'agglomération du Pays de Montbéliard with 3 former communautés de communes and 9 other communes. Its seat is in Montbéliard. Its area is 449.1 km2. Its population was 139,776 in 2017, of which 25,395 in Montbéliard proper.

Composition
The communauté d'agglomération consists of the following 72 communes:

Abbévillers
Allenjoie
Allondans
Arbouans
Audincourt
Autechaux-Roide
Badevel
Bart
Bavans
Berche
Bethoncourt
Beutal
Blamont
Bondeval
Bourguignon
Bretigney
Brognard
Colombier-Fontaine
Courcelles-lès-Montbéliard
Dambelin
Dambenois
Dampierre-les-Bois
Dampierre-sur-le-Doubs
Dannemarie
Dasle
Dung
Échenans
Écot
Écurcey
Étouvans
Étupes
Exincourt
Fesches-le-Châtel
Feule
Glay
Goux-lès-Dambelin
Grand-Charmont
Hérimoncourt
Issans
Longevelle-sur-Doubs
Lougres
Mandeure
Mathay
Meslières
Montbéliard
Montenois
Neuchâtel-Urtière
Noirefontaine
Nommay
Pierrefontaine-lès-Blamont
Pont-de-Roide-Vermondans
Présentevillers
Raynans
Rémondans-Vaivre
Roches-lès-Blamont
Sainte-Marie
Sainte-Suzanne
Saint-Julien-lès-Montbéliard
Saint-Maurice-Colombier
Seloncourt
Semondans
Sochaux
Solemont
Taillecourt
Thulay
Valentigney
Vandoncourt
Vieux-Charmont
Villars-lès-Blamont
Villars-sous-Dampjoux
Villars-sous-Écot
Voujeaucourt

References

Montbeliard
Intercommunalities of Doubs